Leidesia is a monotypic plant genus in the family Euphorbiaceae first described as a genus in 1866. The sole species is Leidesia procumbens. The species is widespread in Southern Africa as far north as Democratic Republic of the Congo.

The genus name of Leidesia is in honour of Carl Friedrich Seidel (d. 1898), a German painter and botanist, and/or Jacob Friedrich Seidel (1789–1860), a German gardener, and/or Johann Heinrich Seidel (1744–1815), a German court gardener.

Species formerly included,
moved to Seidelia 
Leidesia firmula Prain - Seidelia firmula (Prain) Pax & K.Hoffm.

References 

Acalypheae
Monotypic Euphorbiaceae genera
Flora of Southern Africa
Flora of the Democratic Republic of the Congo